Old Elthamians Rugby Football Club is an English rugby union club based in Chislehurst in SE London-Kent. Due to financial difficulties they withdrew from National League One, the third tier of English club rugby, in August, 2021. Upon returning to league rugby and despite only taking one season away, the RFU place Old Elthamians in Counties 3. The club left the College meadows ground and have returned home to Chislehurst

History
Old Elthamians was formed in 1911 and ran four senior teams and a full range of junior teams.  In 2014–15 the club moved ground from the Foxbury to Queen Mary Sports Ground in Chislehurst, where they were resident for just two seasons before moving to their current home of College Meadow (owned by Eltham College) in Mottingham, for the 2016–17 season.  Old Elthamians had their first home game at College Meadow on 17 September 2016, defeating visitors Clifton 46 - 19 in front of 420 spectators. 

On 25 March 2017 Old Elthamians, riding high in National League 2 South, achieved a club record win 97–7 against bottom club Exmouth, a tally that included 15 tries. They finished second that season, qualifying for a promotion play-off against the runner-up from National League 2 North. On 6 May 2017 Old Elthamians travelled to take on Sale at Heywood Road, winning a close game 19–14 to claim promotion to the 2017–18 National League 1; the highest level in the club's history.  The 2016–17 season also saw Dominic Lespierre score 36 league tries to break the previous best of 32 set by Renford Bennet.

On 16 December 2017 Old Elthamians beat Blackheath 32–7 in front of a then club record crowd of 1,653 at College Meadow, in what was the first league meeting between the two sides in 106 years despite both being based in south London.  This record was topped the very next season when a crowd of 1,770 at College Meadow saw  Old Elthamians lose 11–12 to Blackheath on 22 December 2018 in a top of the table clash. Despite this loss Old Elthamians ran Ampthill every step of the way in the 2018-19 season only to end up second in National 1 and miss out on promotion to the Championship by 5 points or one win. This at the time put the Old Boys club in the top 25 clubs in England, but one the RFU was to take no pity or given help to once problems arouse the following season!

Honours
 Kent 2 champions: 2002–03
 Kent Vase winners: 2004
 Kent 1 v Sussex 1 promotion play-off winner: 2004–05
 London Division 4 South West champions: 2005–06
 London Division 2 East champions (2): 2008–09, 2010–11
 London 1 (north v south) promotion play-off winner: 2011–12
 National League 3 (south-east v south-west) promotion play-off winner: 2013–14
 National 2 (north v south) promotion play-off winner: 2016–17

Club records
Largest win: 97–7
Versus Exmouth at College Meadow on 25 March 2017

Highest attendance: 1,770
Versus Blackheath at College Meadow on 22 December 2018

Most tries in a season: 36
 Dominic Lespierre (2016–17)

Final league season

Notes

References

External links
 Official club website

English rugby union teams
Rugby clubs established in 1911
Rugby union clubs in London
Rugby union in Kent
Sport in the London Borough of Bromley